Anthony Bonner (born June 8, 1968) is an American former professional basketball player. He played college basketball for Saint Louis.

College career
Bonner played college basketball at Saint Louis University. He is the Saint Louis Billikens' all-time leading scorer, with 1,972 points.

Professional career
Bonner was selected by the Sacramento Kings, in the first round (23rd overall pick) of the 1990 NBA draft. He played six seasons in the NBA, for the Kings, New York Knicks, and Orlando Magic. He averaged 6.9 points per game in his NBA career. In 2002, at the age of 34, he attempted an NBA comeback with the Utah Jazz. He was cut after playing in 4 preseason games.

He also played in Europe for several notable teams, including PAOK in Greece and Virtus Bologna in Italy.

See also
 List of NCAA Division I men's basketball season rebounding leaders

References

External links

1968 births
Living people
African-American basketball players
American expatriate basketball people in Argentina
American expatriate basketball people in Greece
American expatriate basketball people in Italy
American expatriate basketball people in Russia
American expatriate basketball people in Spain
American expatriate basketball people in Turkey
American men's basketball players
Basketball players from St. Louis
BC UNICS players
Capitanes de Arecibo players
CBA All-Star Game players
CB Breogán players
CB Valladolid players
Galatasaray S.K. (men's basketball) players
Great Lakes Storm players
Leones de Ponce basketball players
Liga ACB players
Maratonistas de Coamo players
New York Knicks players
Orlando Magic players
P.A.O.K. BC players
Peñarol de Mar del Plata basketball players
Power forwards (basketball)
Sacramento Kings draft picks
Sacramento Kings players
Saint Louis Billikens men's basketball players
Saski Baskonia players
Small forwards
Virtus Bologna players
21st-century African-American people
20th-century African-American sportspeople